Ostannie rizdvo 90-kh (Last Christmas of 90's) is an album by the winner of the Eurovision Song Contest 2004, Ruslana, released in 1999. It consists of Christmas carols and other Christmas-related tracks.

Track listing
 "Чудо із чудес…" / "Алелуя!" ("Miracle of miracles" / "Halleluyah!")
 "In Excelsis Deo"
 "Коляда"
 "Добрий вечір тобі…"
 "Радуйся, світ!"
 "Тиха ніч" ("Silent night")
 Різдвяна тема (live) (Christmas theme (live))
 інтродукція до фільму "Різдво з Русланою" "Тиха ніч" (live) (Introduction to film "Christmas with Ruslana" "Silent Night" (live))
 "Чудо із чудес…" / "Алелуя!" (live)
 "Радуйся, світ!" (instrumental)
 "Добрий вечір тобі…" (instrumental)

Ruslana albums
1999 albums

cs:Diskografie Ruslany#Ostanně Rizdvo 90-ch